Kenscoff is a commune in the Port-au-Prince Arrondissement, in the Ouest department of Haiti, located in the foothills of the Chaîne de la Selle mountain range, some 10 kilometres to the southeast of the capital city of Port-au-Prince. The elevation is approximately 1500 meters, making the town the highest permanent settlement in the Caribbean. It has a population of around 52,200.

Climate
Because of its elevation, the temperature is constantly cooler than the capital and, during winter months, can be very chilly relative to the rest of the country. However, it is not the coldest settlement on Hispanola, as Constanza in the Dominican Republic is colder on average year-round, most likely due to being more inland than Kenscoff, which is only around 12 km (7.5 mi) from the coast.
 
Kenscoff has a subtropical highland climate (Cwb) with monthly temperature averages ranging from 64.2 °F in January to 70.5 °F in August. This climate borders on a tropical savanna climate (Aw).

Commerce
The town has a weekly market where rural farmers congregate to sell their goods and produce; some farmers traveling great distances on foot to do so.

Organizations
Kenscoff is the home of the Baptist Haiti Mission, Hospital De Fermathe, the Wynne Farm Ecological Reserve, and the Architectural Association Haiti Visiting School.

References

Populated places in Ouest (department)
Communes of Haiti